The following is a list of winners and nominees in English-language categories for the Trillium Book Award, a Canadian literary award presented by Ontario Creates to honour books published by writers resident in the province of Ontario. Separate awards have been presented for French-language literature since 1994; for the winners and nominees in French-language categories, see Trillium Book Award, French.

All-genre (1994-2002)

Prose (2003-present)

Poetry (2003-present)

References

Ontario awards
Canadian children's literary awards
Canadian poetry awards
Canadian fiction awards
Canadian non-fiction literary awards